"Live Your Dream" is the first single taken from beFour's third studio album We Stand United, in Germany, Austria and Switzerland . As of March 28, the song has officially entered the German Singles Chart. The Song was the theme song of the German release of the movie Horton hears a Who

Formats and track listings
These are the formats and track listings of major single releases of "Live Your Dream".

Maxi CD single
"Live Your Dream" (Single version) – 3:44
"Live Your Dream" (Extended Version) - 5:25
"Hand In Hand" (Hit-Mix 2008) - 5:15
"Live Your Dream" (Video) - 3:44

Digital Download
"Live Your Dream" (Single version) – 3:44
"Live Your Dream" (Extended Version) - 5:25
"Hand In Hand" (Hit-Mix 2008)- 5:15
"Live Your Dream" (Video) - 3:44

Charts

References 

2008 songs
BeFour songs
Universal Records singles
Songs written by Christian Geller
Song recordings produced by Christian Geller